Hagibis is a Filipino comic book character.

Hagibis may also refer to:

Storms
 Typhoon Hagibis (2019)
 Tropical Storm Hagibis (2014)
 Typhoon Hagibis (2007)
 Typhoon Hagibis (2002)

Other uses
 Hagibis (band), a Filipino boy band
 Hagibis (album)
 Honda Hagibis, a defunct Philippine Basketball Association team

See also
 Typhoon Hagibis (disambiguation), a list of tropical storms named Hagibis